In mathematics, in the field of complex analysis, a Nevanlinna function  is a complex function which is an analytic function on the open upper half-plane  and has non-negative imaginary part. A Nevanlinna function maps the upper half-plane to itself or to a real constant, but is not necessarily injective or surjective. Functions with this property are sometimes also known as Herglotz, Pick or R functions.

Integral representation

Every Nevanlinna function  admits a representation

 

Conversely, every function of this form turns out to be a Nevanlinna function. 
The constants in this representation are related to the function  via

A very similar representation of functions is also called the Poisson representation.

Examples
Some elementary examples of Nevanlinna functions follow (with appropriately chosen branch cuts in the first three).

 (an example that is surjective but not injective).

 A Möbius transformation

This is equivalent to the set of such transformations that map the real axis to itself. One may then add any constant in the upper half-plane, and move the pole into the lower half-plane, giving new values for the parameters. Example: 

The second is neither injective nor surjective.

 is a Nevanlinna function.

References

General
 
  
 

Complex analysis